The 1917 U.S. National Championships (now known as the US Open), officially renamed that year to National Patriotic Tournament,  was a tennis tournament that took place on the outdoor grass courts at the West Side Tennis Club, Forest Hills in New York City, United States. The tournament ran from 20 August until 25 August. It was the 37th staging of the U.S. National Championships and due to World War I the only Grand Slam tennis event of the year.

National Patriotic Tournament
The tournament was renamed National Patriotic Tournament in support of the war effort. No trophies were handed out to the winners and the entrance fees were dedicated to the American Red Cross.  Robert Lindley Murray  defeated Bostonian Nathaniel W. Niles in four sets in the men's final.

In the commemorative book 'Fifty Years of Lawn Tennis in the United States', published by the USLTA in 1931, Lindley Murray commented on the final: "I succeeded in beating Nat Niles 5–7, 8–6, 6–3, 6–3, plenty of indication that the match was close and hard fought. I remember well that, try as I would, I could not get into the full swing of my game those first two sets. This was because my opponent was driving beautifully, particularly low, fast ones to my backhand. In addition he was lobbing so accurately and deeply that, try as I would, I could not bring off my kills. Nat led me one set to love and 6–5 in the second set. which was mighty close to being two sets down. But about that time my game began to get going. Up until that time I had just been missing and while desperately dashing all over the court my shots would end in just hitting the net or just going out. From the twelfth game of the second set, on for the rest of the match, things began to go right, and at the end I felt as if I was playing as well as I know how."

Finals

Men's singles

 Robert Lindley Murray defeated  Nathaniel W. Niles  5–7, 8–6, 6–3, 6–3

Women's singles

 Molla Bjurstedt defeated  Marion Vanderhoef 4–6, 6–0, 6–2

Men's doubles
 Fred Alexander /  Harold Throckmorton defeated  Harry Johnson /  Irving Wright 11–9, 6–4, 6–4

Women's doubles
 Molla Bjurstedt /  Eleonora Sears defeated  Phyllis Walsh /  Grace Moore LeRoy 6–2, 6–4

Mixed doubles
 Molla Bjurstedt /  Irving Wright defeated  Florence Ballin /  Bill Tilden 10–12, 6–1, 6–3

References

External links
Official US Open website

 
U.S. National Championships
U.S. National Championships (tennis) by year
U.S. National Championships (tennis)
U.S. National Championships (tennis)
U.S. National Championships (tennis)
U.S. National Championships (tennis)